A Shepard tone, named after Roger Shepard, is a sound consisting of a superposition of sine waves separated by octaves. When played with the bass pitch of the tone moving upward or downward, it is referred to as the Shepard scale. This creates the auditory illusion of a tone that seems to continually ascend or descend in pitch, yet which ultimately gets no higher or lower.

Construction

Each square in Figure 1 indicates a tone, with any set of squares in vertical alignment together making one Shepard tone. The color of each square indicates the loudness of the note, with purple being the quietest and green the loudest. Overlapping notes that play at the same time are exactly one octave apart, and each scale fades in and fades out so that hearing the beginning or end of any given scale is impossible. 

As a conceptual example of an ascending Shepard scale, the first tone could be an almost inaudible C4 (middle C) and a loud C5 (an octave higher). The next would be a slightly louder C4 and a slightly quieter C5; the next would be a still louder D4 and a still quieter D5. The two frequencies would be equally loud at the middle of the octave (F4 and F5), and the twelfth tone would be a loud B4 and an almost inaudible B5 with the addition of an almost inaudible B3. The thirteenth tone would then be the same as the first, and the cycle could continue indefinitely. (In other words, each tone consists of two sine waves with frequencies separated by octaves; the intensity of each is e.g. a raised cosine function of its separation in semitones from a peak frequency, which in the above example would be B4. According to Shepard, "almost any smooth distribution that tapers off to subthreshold levels at low and high frequencies would have done as well as the cosine curve actually employed."

The theory behind the illusion was demonstrated during an episode of the BBC's show Bang Goes the Theory, where the effect was described as "a musical barber's pole".

The scale as described, with discrete steps between each tone, is known as the discrete Shepard scale. The illusion is more convincing if there is a short time between successive notes (staccato or marcato rather than legato or portamento).

Variants

Shepard–Risset glissando
Jean-Claude Risset subsequently created a version of the scale where the tones glide continuously, and it is appropriately called the continuous Risset scale or Shepard–Risset glissando. When done correctly, the tone appears to rise (or fall) continuously in pitch, yet return to its starting note. Risset has also created a similar effect with rhythm in which tempo seems to increase or decrease endlessly.

Tritone paradox

A sequentially played pair of Shepard tones separated by an interval of a tritone (half an octave) produces the tritone paradox. Shepard had predicted that the two tones would constitute a bistable figure, the auditory equivalent of the Necker cube, that could be heard ascending or descending, but never both at the same time.

In 1986, Diana Deutsch discovered that the perception of which tone was higher depended on the absolute frequencies involved and that an individual would usually hear the same pitch as the highest (this is determined by the absolute pitch of the notes). Interestingly, different listeners may perceive the same pattern as being either ascending or descending, depending on the language or dialect of the listener (Deutsch, Henthorn, and Dolson found that native speakers of Vietnamese, a tonal language, heard the tritone paradox differently from Californians who were native speakers of English).

Perpetual melody 
Pedro Patricio observed in 2012 that, by using a Shepard tone as a sound source and applying it to a melody, he could reproduce the illusion of a continuously ascending or descending movement characteristic of the Shepard Scale. Regardless of the tempo and the envelope of the notes, the auditory illusion is effectively maintained. The uncertainty of the scale the Shepard tones pertain allows composers to experiment with deceiving and disconcerting melodies.

Examples 
 James Tenney's For Ann (rising) consists entirely of a Shepard tone glissando with gradual modulations.
 A section near the end of Karlheinz Stockhausen's Hymnen incorporates multiple descending Shepard tone glissandos.
 The ending of The Beatles' "I Am the Walrus" incorporates a Shepard tone with a chord progression built on ascending and descending lines in the bass and strings that line up to create the auditory illusion.
 The ending of Pink Floyd's "Echoes" from their 1971 album Meddle features an ascending Shepard tone created using a feedback technique involving two tape recorders sharing a single tape, with one set to play and the other to record.
 Queen's 1976 album A Day at the Races opens and closes with a Shepard tone.
 In his 1979 book Gödel, Escher, Bach: An Eternal Golden Braid, Douglas Hofstadter explained how Shepard scales could be used on the Canon a 2, per tonos in Bach's Musical Offering (called the Endlessly Rising Canon by Hofstadter) for making the modulation end in the same pitch instead of an octave higher.
 In 1995, Ira Braus argued that the final sequence of Franz Liszt's 1885 piano piece Bagatelle sans tonalité could be continued to produce a Shepard scale using Hofstadter's technique.
 In a 1967 AT&T film by Shepard and E. E. Zajac, a Shepard tone accompanies the ascent of an analogous Penrose stair.
In the video game Super Mario 64 (1996) for the Nintendo 64 console, a piece that plays when the player tries to climb the neverending stairs located in the penultimate room of Peach's Castle incorporates a slightly modified Shepard scale played in the background. This auditory illusion complements the spatial loop effect, seemingly giving the impression that the stairs never end.
 In Godspeed You! Black Emperor's "The Dead Flag Blues" from their 1997 album F♯ A♯ ∞, a section mainly consisting of slide guitar is briefly looped into itself to create a downward Shepard tone.
On their 1998 album LP5, English electronic duo Autechre employed a decelerating Risset rhythm for the track "Fold4,Wrap5".
Austrian composer Georg Friedrich Haas incorporates Shepard tones at various points in his orchestral piece in vain (2000/02).
 Christopher Nolan said in an interview that the soundtrack of his film The Prestige (composed by David Julyan) explores the potential of Shepard tones as a fundamental basis for compositions.
 In Stephin Merritt's 2007 song "Man of a Million Faces", composed for NPR's "Project Song", the Shepard tone is a key aspect.
 In the 2008 film The Dark Knight and its 2012 followup The Dark Knight Rises, a Shepard tone was used to create the sound of the Batpod, a motorcycle that the filmmakers did not want to change gear and tone abruptly but to accelerate constantly.
 In the 2017 film Dunkirk, a Shepard tone is used to create the illusion of an ever increasing moment of intensity across intertwined storylines.
In Lucrecia Martel's feature film Zama (2017), there is extensive use of the Shepard tone creating a "loud and shreechy soundscape, in order to achieve closeness to the viewer", according to the director.
 The 2018 track "Always Ascending" by Franz Ferdinand from the album of the same name features a rising Shepard tone throughout the song. The video for the song echoes the effect, with the camera apparently rising continually throughout.
In Sumio Kobayashi's piano work "Unreal Rain", the Shepard tone is entirely used.

See also

 Chorus effect
 Deep Note
 Flanging
 Interference (wave propagation)
 Phaser (effect)
 Pitch circularity
 Strange loop
Sound Effects

References

External links 

 BBC science show, Bang Goes the Theory, explains the Shepard Tone
 Demonstration of discrete Shepard tone (requires Macromedia Shockwave)
 Visualization of the Shepard Effect using Java
 A demonstration of a rising Shepard Scale as a ball bounces endlessly up a Penrose staircase (and down)
 Shepard tone Keyboard on CodePen
Tritone paradox example (requires Java)
Pedro Patricio's compositions formed around the auditory illusion of the perpetual melody (Perpetual Melody - contrasting moments, 1-7)
An E5 Shinkansen Bullet Train Departing Tokyo Station plays the sound of a Shepard Tone possibly due to how many cars and systems have to activate

Auditory illusions